Penicillium griseopurpureum is a species of the genus of Penicillium.

References

griseopurpureum
Fungi described in 1965